Simeon Rottier (born January 21, 1984) is a retired professional Canadian football offensive lineman. He was drafted by the Hamilton Tiger-Cats with the first overall pick in the 2009 CFL Draft, becoming the first player from Alberta to be taken first overall. He played CIS football for the Alberta Golden Bears and he played junior football for the Edmonton Huskies.

Khalif Mitchell was suspended by the CFL on July 23, 2012, for two games without pay after he violently hyperextended the arm of Rottier. He announced his retirement from professional football career on 17 May 2018 after nine seasons in the Canadian Football League, having spent the previous six seasons prior to his retirement playing for the Edmonton Eskimos.

References

External links
Edmonton Eskimos bio

1984 births
Living people
Alberta Golden Bears football players
Canadian football offensive linemen
Canadian Junior Football League players
Edmonton Elks players
Hamilton Tiger-Cats players
People from Westlock County
Players of Canadian football from Alberta